Repossessed may refer to:

Repossessed (film), a 1990 American comedy film
Repossessed (album), a 1986 album by Kris Kristofferson
Repossessed, a novel by A. M. Jenkins

See also
 Repossession